Charles Henry Philippe Lévêque de Vilmorin (26 February 1843 - 23 August 1899) was a French botanist, the son of Pierre François "Louis" Lévêque de Vilmorin (1816-1860) and Elisa Bailly (1826-1868), and grandfather of the novelist, poet and journalist, Louise de Vilmorin. Seven generations of the family of Vilmorin contributed greatly to French agriculture for over two hundred and thirty years by their improvements of sugar-beet and wheat - they published more than three hundred and sixty articles on plants in agriculture, horticulture, floriculture and botany.

Henry's great-grandfather Philippe Victoire de Vilmorin 1746-1804 and his wife's father, Pierre Andrieux, chief seed supplier and botanist to King Louis XV, revived an old seed-growing firm and named it Vilmorin-Andrieux in 1774. Henry headed the firm from 1873 and was the first to hybridise wheat. As a result, he introduced 18 strains of high-yield wheat while continuing his father’s work on the breeding of sugar beets, and publishing Les meilleurs blés ('The Best Wheat') in 1880 with descriptions of the best winter and spring wheat varieties and their cultivation. This was followed by a supplement published by Vilmorin-Andrieux et Cie in 1909. He also produced a small book Flowers of the French Riviera in 1893.

Hooker dedicated the 125th volume of Curtis's Botanical Magazine to him.

Family
He was married in 1869 to Louise Julie Darblay, the daughter of Jacques-Paul Darblay 1814-1854 and Marguerite-Julie Rousseau 1825-1896. They produced 7 children:

 Caroline Marie Julie Elisabeth Lévêque de Vilmorin 1870-1940
 Joseph Lévêque de Vilmorin 1872-1917
 Louise Marie Thérèse Lévêque de Vilmorin 1873-1967
 Jean Louis Marie Lévêque de Vilmorin 1876-1946
 Charles Claude Marie Marc Lévêque de Vilmorin 1880-1944
 Louis Lévêque de Vilmorin 1883-1944
 Paul Marie Vincent Lévêque de Vilmorin 1885-1940

Memberships
Académie d'agriculture de France 28 February 1885
Société botanique de France Life member (1860), President (1889)
Société de l'histoire de Paris et de l'Île-de-France

Publications
Assainissement de la Seine. Épuration et utilisation des eaux d'égout. Commission d'études. Rapport de la première sous-commission chargée d'étudier les procédés de culture horticole à l'aide des eaux d'égout., 1878
Les Blés à cultiver, conférence faite au congrès de l'Association nationale de la meunerie française, le 7 septembre 1887, à Paris (2e édition), suivie de l'Hiver de 1890-1891 et les blés, par Henry L. de Vilmorin, 1892
Catalogue méthodique et synonymique des froments qui composent la collection de Henry L. de Vilmorin,.., 1889
Le Chrysanthème, histoire, physiologie et culture en France et à l'étranger, 1896
Les Cultures de betteraves faites à la colonie de Mettray sous la direction de la Société des agriculteurs de France en 1875, rapport présenté à l'Assemblée générale le 15 mars 1876, par M. Henry Vilmorin, 1876
Exposition universelle internationale de 1878 à Paris, groupe V, classe 46. Rapport sur les produits agricoles non alimentaires, 1881
Les Fleurs à Paris, culture et commerce, par Philippe L. de Vilmorin. Introduction par Henry L. de Vilmorin,..., 1892
L'Hérédité chez les végétaux, 1890
Les Légumes de grande culture, par M. Henry Lévêque de Vilmorin,., 1894
Les légumes usuels, 1890
Les Meilleures pommes de terre, conférence faite au Concours agricole général de Paris le 30 janvier 1888
Les Meilleurs blés, description et culture des principales variétés de froments d'hiver et de printemps, 1880
Note sur une expérience relative à l'étude de l'hérédité dans les végétaux, 1879
Notice biographique sur Alphonse Lavallée, trésorier perpétuel de la Société nationale d'agriculture, 1886
Les Plantes de grande culture : céréales, plantes fourragères, industrielles et économiques, 1892
Syndicat des agriculteurs du Loiret, conférence du 24 octobre 1891, par M. H. de Vilmorin. Du Choix des blés de semence, des soins à leur donner

External links
Biography

References

19th-century French botanists
1843 births
1899 deaths